Anna of Tyrol (4 October 1585 – 14 December 1618) was by birth an Archduchess of Austria and member of the Tyrolean branch of the House of Habsburg and by marriage Holy Roman Empress, German Queen, Queen of Bohemia and Queen of Hungary.

The first crowned Holy Roman Empress since the mid-15th century, she was responsible for the moving of the Imperial court from Prague to Vienna, which became one of the centers of European culture. A proponent of the Counter-Reformation, she held a great influence over her husband Matthias, with whom she founded the Imperial Crypt, which later became the burial place of the Habsburg dynasty.

Biography

Early years
Anna was born in Innsbruck on 4 October 1585 as the third and last daughter of Ferdinand II, Archduke of Further Austria, and Count of Tyrol, and his second wife, Anna Caterina Gonzaga. She had two older sisters, Archduchesses Anna Eleonore (26 June 1583 – 15 January 1584) and Maria (16 June 1584 – 2 March 1649), later a nun. All of them suffered from poor health from birth.

Her baptism was conducted with special solemnity, being organized by her uncles Maximilian III, Archduke of Austria, and Prince Ferdinand of Bavaria. The godfather of the princess was Emperor Maximilian II (another uncle), for whom his son Archduke Ernest of Austria stood as proxy, while the rite was celebrated by the Bishop of Brixen.

Anna spent her childhood at the Innsbruck court, which thanks to her parents became in the center of Renaissance culture. She lived in Ambras Castle, Hofburg and Ruelyust Palaces. In order to protect the health of her daughter, after 1590 Archduchess-Countess Anna Caterina had a personal cookbook. In January 1595, the princess lost her father. Her widowed mother made every effort to give her daughters a good education. Anna then discovered an unusual musical talent, she was given a clavichord (a rare and expensive instrument), and a teacher was hired. The love for music remained in the princess throughout her life.

Anna was raised in a strict Catholic environment. Even as Holy Roman Empress, when she believed that she had committed a sin, she engaged in self-flagellation to torment the flesh. Anna Caterina made frequent pilgrimages, but didn't take her daughters with her due to their poor health. In 1606, she decided to found a convent there in Innsbruck for the Servants of Mary, Religious Sisters of the Servite Third Order, of which she was a member, and after arranging the marriage of her youngest daughter, she took her monastic vows, taking a new name – Anna Juliana. Maria, Anna's older sister, followed their mother's example and also took the veil in the same convent under their mother's former name.

Marriage and coronation
Upon reaching adulthood, Anna began to receive offers of marriage. The first proposal was made in 1603 by King Sigismund III of Poland (then a widower), but Emperor Rudolf II didn't give his consent. Then the Emperor expressed his intention to marry the princess and sent his court painter to Innsbruck, to make a portrait of his intended bride. Once the Emperor showed his interest in Anna, her mother stopped taking other marriage proposals for her, but soon Rudolf II retracted his proposal. The Emperor's younger brother Archduke Matthias also began to woo her, and some time later, Rudolf II allowed the marriage of his brother to his former fiancée.

Anna and Matthias (at that point already King of Hungary and Bohemia) married on 4 December 1611 in Vienna at the Augustinian Church; bride and groom were first cousins –Matthias' father Emperor Maximilian II was an elder brother of Anna's father, Archduke Ferdinand II. Matthias, although he was already in his fifties, hoped to sire an heir with his 26-year-old wife. Four years later, when Anna became slightly stout, rumors began at the imperial court that she had finally become pregnant. But soon courtiers began to joke that her corpulence was not related to a pregnancy but because she had a very good appetite. Ultimately, the union was childless.

On 21 May 1612 Matthias was elected King of Germany and Holy Roman Emperor. Anna was crowned Holy Roman Empress and Queen of Germany in Frankfurt on 15 June 1612, two days after her husband, re-assuming the tradition of the coronation of emperors' wives. She was the first crowned Empress since Eleanor of Portugal. Anna was also crowned Queen of Hungary on 25 March 1613 in Pressburg and Queen of Bohemia on 10 January 1616 in Prague.

Called the "Good-natured and loving Empress", she had a great influence over her husband, jointly with Matthias' mistress Susana Wachter. Contemporaries called both spouses the "Working Couple" (de: Arbeitspaar). Upon his wife's request Matthias transferred the Imperial court from Prague to Vienna, and soon, thanks to their joint efforts, the new court was one of the centers of European culture. The Empress was also noted for the special protection she provided to her Tyroleans subjects, arranging different positions for them at court. As a devout Catholic, she refused to talk to or interact with Protestant courtiers. Like her mother, Anna collected relics, especially from the holy ascetics. She also patronized the Capuchins, and later played an important role in the Austrian Counter-Reformation. For her devotion to the Roman Catholic Church, Pope Paul V awarded the Empress with the Golden Rose.

Last years and death
In 1617 Anna and her husband founded the Capuchin Church, Vienna.  On 10 November 1618 construction began on their tomb. Anna died a month after construction started, on 14 December 1618 aged 33; her husband died only three months later, on 20 March 1619. Both spouses were temporarily buried in the royal Poor Clare monastery in Vienna. Only after the completion of construction of the built, which was continued by their cousin and successor, Emperor Ferdinand II, in 1633 the coffins with the remains of Matthias and Anna were transferred into the tomb, known as the Imperial Crypt. Their coffins were placed side by side. It was only during the reign of Emperor Ferdinand III that the Imperial crypt finally became the burial place of the Habsburg dynasty.

Ancestors

Notes

References

Bibliography

, pp. 152–4248 p. online
 

|-

|-

|-

Holy Roman Empresses
17th-century House of Habsburg
German queens consort
Hungarian queens consort
Bohemian queens consort
Austrian princesses
Austrian royal consorts
1585 births
1618 deaths
People from Innsbruck
17th-century women of the Holy Roman Empire
17th-century people of the Holy Roman Empire
Burials at the Imperial Crypt
Burials at St. Stephen's Cathedral, Vienna
Daughters of monarchs